Lawrence "Pun" Plamondon (born April 27, 1945) is a former 1960s left-wing activist who helped found the White Panther Party. He was the first hippie to be listed on the FBI's Ten Most Wanted Fugitives list due to his alleged participation in a bombing, though charges were ultimately dropped due to high-level governmental agency misconduct.

Biography 
Plamondon's birth father was half-Odawa and his birth mother was part-Ojibwe, which he was unaware of early in life. A Traverse City, Michigan, couple adopted him and gave him his name, Lawrence Robert Plamondon. Plamondon had a troubled childhood and left home as a teenager.

At the age of 21, Plamondon was in Detroit, Michigan, in 1967, when the protests against the Vietnam War and a riot occurred. Making sandals during the day and smoking marijuana in the evening, he was soon meeting with John Sinclair.

In 1968, Plamondon and a few friends moved to Ann Arbor, Michigan, where they established a commune at 1510 Hill Street. With John Sinclair, they founded the White Panther Party, which supported the goals of the Black Panther Party. He was indicted for bombing a CIA office in Ann Arbor on September 29, 1968. Changing his appearance, he went underground and fled to San Francisco, Seattle, New York, Germany, Italy, and finally to Algeria. In May 1970, he was listed on the FBI's Ten Most Wanted Fugitives list. After a few months he covertly returned to the United States. In July 1970, Plamondon was discovered and arrested after being stopped for littering. He was the 307th fugitive to be placed on the FBI's Ten Most Wanted fugitives list and spent nearly three months on the list before being captured.

While waiting trial and after being convicted, he spent 32 months in federal prison. During the trial, the government admitted to wiretapping without a warrant. The case went to the United States Supreme Court and was decided in United States v. U.S. District Court, also now famously known as the Keith Case, which held that not even the invocation of "national security" by the president of the United States could insulate illegal activity from Constitutional rights to privacy. The charges were dismissed.

Later, Plamondon found work driving equipment trucks for rock bands including Kiss and Foreigner.

Plamondon lives in Barry County, Michigan, with his wife Patricia Lynn. He is a self-employed carpenter. He tells American Indian stories to young children at schools, libraries, museums, and summer camps. His home is a gathering place for American Indian celebrations.

See also 
 List of fugitives from justice who disappeared

Writings 
Plamondon's autobiography:

References

General references 
 Marsha Low, "'60s radical takes long trip back to his roots," Detroit Free Press, October 27, 2004, Sec. B.

Adapted from the Wikinfo article Lawrence (Pun) Plamondon (October 28, 2004, or earlier version) and is used under the GNU Free Documentation License

External links 
 The Story of United States v. United States District Court (Keith): The Surveillance Power

1945 births
Native American activists
Odawa people
Ojibwe people
People from Ann Arbor, Michigan
Native American writers
COINTELPRO targets
People from Barry County, Michigan
Living people
American adoptees
FBI Ten Most Wanted Fugitives